is a railway station on the Fujikyuko Line in the city of Fujiyoshida, Yamanashi, Japan, operated by Fuji Kyuko (Fujikyu). The station is at an altitude of 739 meters.

Lines

Station layout
The station is unstaffed, and consists of one side platform serving a single bidirectional track, with the station structure located on the south side of the track. It has a waiting room but no toilet facilities.

Adjacent stations

History

Passenger statistics
In fiscal 1998, the station was used by an average of 173 passengers daily.

Surrounding area
 Yoshinoike Onsen (hot spring after which the station is named)
 Chūō Expressway

References

External links

 Fujikyuko station information 

Railway stations in Yamanashi Prefecture
Railway stations in Japan opened in 1930
Stations of Fuji Kyuko
Fujiyoshida